A list of Bangladeshi films released in 1994.

Releases

See also

1994 in Bangladesh
List of Bangladeshi films of 1995
List of Bangladeshi films
Cinema of Bangladesh
Dhallywood

References

Film
Bangladesh
 1994